The Dale Gardner Veterans Memorial Bridge, often referred to as the New Savanna-Sabula Bridge, or by the same name as its predecessor, the Savanna-Sabula Bridge, is a steel tied-arch that carries U.S. Route 52 (US 52) across the Mississippi River. It connects the city of Savanna, Illinois, with the island city of Sabula, Iowa. Construction on the span began in 2016 and it opened on November 17, 2017. It was erected by Bumpy's Steel Erection of East St. Louis, Illinois and Edward Kraemer & Sons of Plain, Wisconsin. The bridge replaced the Savanna–Sabula Bridge, which was located a few yards to the north.

The Dale Gardner Veterans Memorial Bridge was closed on February 27, 2018 while an adjoining causeway was replaced. The causeway bridge was deemed unsafe until the replacement was complete. The closure necessitated a  detour to Clinton, Iowa/Fulton, Illinois. A complimentary ferry service between Savanna and Sabula began operations on June 12. The bridge was re-opened on August 31, 2018.

References

See also
List of crossings of the Upper Mississippi River

Bridges over the Mississippi River
Road bridges in Iowa
Road bridges in Illinois
Bridges of the United States Numbered Highway System
U.S. Route 52
Tied arch bridges in the United States
Bridges completed in 2017
Transportation in Jackson County, Iowa
Transportation in Carroll County, Illinois